Fairwood is the name of some places in the U.S. state of Washington:

Fairwood, King County, Washington
Fairwood, Spokane County, Washington